Trabala lambourni is a moth of the family Lasiocampidae first described by George Thomas Bethune-Baker in 1911. It is found in Nigeria and the Democratic Republic of the Congo.

Biology
A known host plant is Terminalia catappa.

References

Lasiocampidae
Insects of West Africa
Moths of Africa